Paraburkholderia kururiensis is a species of bacteria.

It was isolated by Zhang et al. from a groundwater sample in Japan. The sample was heavily contaminated with the industrial solvent trichloroethylene (TCE), which Paraburkholderia kururiensis degraded.

Phenotypic characteristics
Phenotypically, P. kururiensis is a Gram negative bacterium with an oval cell morphology. It was found to metabolise simple sugars such as mannose, glucose, galactose and maltose, as well as alcohols such as glycerol, inositol and mannitol.

Genotypic characteristics
Genotypically, studies of 16s ribosomal RNA suggested P. kururiensis belonged to the genus Paraburkholderia. The G+C total DNA content was measured as 64.8 mol %, as perhaps would be expected for Pseudomonadota.

Type strain
Based on information gathered during phenotypic and genotypic analysis, the KP23T strain isolated by Zhang et al. was reckoned to be a new species in the genus, and the name Burkholderia kururiensis was proposed. The type strain is KP23T (= JCM 10599). It has since been transferred to the genus Paraburkholderia.

References

kururiensis
Bacteria described in 2000